Ramin Muzaffar oglu Hasanov (born November 7, 1977) is an Azerbaijani diplomat, the Ambassador Extraordinary and Plenipotentiary of the Republic of Azerbaijan to the Republic of Korea. Before he was the Ambassador Extraordinary and Plenipotentiary of the Republic of Azerbaijan to the Federal Republic of Germany .

Life 
Ramin Hasanov was born on November 7, 1977.

He completed secondary education in 1994. From 1994 to 1998 he studied for a bachelor's degree at the International Relations and International Law Faculty of Baku State University. From 1998 to 2000 he continued his study for a master's degree at the same faculty and in 2000 got master's degree in international law. In 1999 he attended the courses for international diplomats organized by the Ministry of Foreign Affairs of Germany.

He speaks Azerbaijani, German, English, Russian and Turkish.

He is married and has two children.

Diplomatic career 

Ramin Hasanov started diplomatic service in 1999.

From 1999 to 2000 he served as a desk officer and attaché at the Europe and Canada Department of the Ministry of Foreign Affairs of the Republic of Azerbaijan.

From 2000 to 2003 he worked as an attaché and third secretary of the Embassy of the Republic of Azerbaijan in Germany.

From 2003 to 2004 he was a third secretary and second secretary at the First Western Territorial Department of the Ministry of Foreign Affairs of the Republic of Azerbaijan.

From 2004 to 2005 he worked as a second secretary at the International Law and Treaties Department of the Ministry of Foreign Affairs of the Republic of Azerbaijan.

From 2005 to 2009 he served as a second secretary, first secretary and then as a counsellor of the Embassy of the Republic of Azerbaijan to the Swiss Confederation and Principality of Liechtenstein.

From 2009 to 2010 he was a head of division and from 2010 to 2013 a deputy-director at the International Law and Treaties Department of the Ministry of Foreign Affairs of the Republic of Azerbaijan.

In 2013 he was appointed the Director of the International Law and Treaties Department of the Ministry of Foreign Affairs of the Republic of Azerbaijan and worked in this position until 2016.

Ramin Hasanov represented Azerbaijan in numerous bilateral and multilateral events as part of official delegations of the Republic of Azerbaijan.

From September 7, 2016, to August 19, 2022, he was the Ambassador Extraordinary and Plenipotentiary of the Republic of Azerbaijan to Germany.

By an Order of the President of the Republic of Azerbaijan , dated 19 August 2022, Ramin Hasanov was appointed the Ambassador Extraordinary and Plenipotentiary of the Republic of Azerbaijan to the Republic of Korea.

On July 24, 2009, he was awarded with the medal of the 90th anniversary of diplomatic service organs of the Republic of Azerbaijan.

By an Order of the President of the Republic of Azerbaijan 2340, dated 7 July 2012, he was awarded with the medal of "Distinguished diplomatic service".

By an Order of the President of the Republic of Azerbaijan, dated 9 July 2019, Ramin Hasanov was awarded the diplomatic rank of the Ambassador Extraordinary and Plenipotentiary.

See also 
 Germany–Azerbaijan relations

References

 Neue Botschafter. In: diplomatisches-magazin.de. www.diplomatisches-magazin.de, 27 October 2016, retrieved 22 March 2017.
 e-qanun.az
 president.az
 berlin.mfa.gov.az
 

1977 births
Azerbaijani diplomats
Living people